Marya "Sally" Carter (born Zella Maria Grajeda; May 12, 1942) is an American model and actress. She was Playboy magazine's Playmate of the month for its May 1962 issue. Her centerfold was photographed by Paul Morton Smith.

During the 1960s and 1970s, Carter pursued an acting career, mostly appearing in B-movies and guest roles on television. She used several names for her credits; among them were Sally Carter, Sally Carter Hunt, Sally Carter Ihnat, and Sally Ihnat.

She was married to Steve Ihnat, a character actor best known for playing Fleet Captain Garth of Izar in the Star Trek episode "Whom Gods Destroy". They had two children. Steve Ihnat died in 1972 of a heart attack.   She was subsequently married to game show host Peter Marshall.

Filmography 
 Switch – "Dangerous Curves" (1978) ... Adele
 Charlie's Angels – "Terror on Ward One" (1977) ... Nurse Farragut
 The Rookies:
 Sudden Death (1976)
 Key Witness (1974) ... Mrs. Stafford
 Frozen Smoke (1973) ... Mrs. Potter
 The Trial of Chaplain Jensen (1975) (TV) ... Irene Daniels
 The New Land – "The Word Is: Persistence" (1974)
 Police Story – "Chain of Command" (1974) ... Janice Magill
 Emergency! – "Audit" (1973) ... First Woman
 The Red Pony (1973) (TV) ... Miss Willis
 Do Not Throw Cushions Into the Ring (1970) ... The Wife
 The New Interns (1964) ... Nurse
 The Greatest Show on Earth – "A Place to Belong" (1964) ... Jeannie
 My Favorite Martian – "Who Am I?" (1964) ... Nurse
 The Dick Van Dyke Show – "The Man from Emperor" (1964) ... Sexy Secretary/Florence
 The Alfred Hitchcock Hour – "Goodbye, George" (1963) ... Starlet
 The Phantom Planet (1961) ... Juror

References

External links 

 Marya Carter May 1962

1942 births
Living people
1960s Playboy Playmates
Place of birth missing (living people)